Autodesk 123D was a suite of hobbyist CAD and 3D modelling tools created by Autodesk. It is similar in scope to Trimble SketchUp and is based on Autodesk Inventor. As well as the more basic drawing and modelling capabilities it also has assembly and constraint support and STL export. Available for the software is also a library of ready-made blocks and objects.

Autodesk worked in collaboration with three companies (Ponoko, Techshop and 3D Systems) to make the software capable creating physical objects from designs using 3D printing technology.

The 123D apps were discontinued by Autodesk beginning November 2016 and completing March 2017. The tools in the 123D suite were replaced by Tinkercad, Fusion 360, and ReCap Pro.

Additional applications
The 123D suite consists of the programs:
 Catch: Creates 3D models from series of photographs taken at various angles using photogrammetry
 Sculpt+: Allows manipulation of virtual clay into a model
 Make: Allows creation of low-tech LOM-style solid models
 Design: Simplified program to create 3D models
 Creature: Allows creation of creatures in 3D on iPad
 Circuits: Virtual breadboarding and circuit design application
 Tinkercad: 3D printing app
 MeshMixer: A tool for working with mesh models

Autodesk Catch 
Catch uses photogrammetry technology to create a 3D model out of multiple pictures taken by the user. It does this by stitching together the images with common visual structures automatically, then asking the user to help connect points that could not be determined through software. Catch can be used to create 3D models of people, places, and things. With the creation of an Autodesk account, users can also export their newly created models to further manipulate in popular 3D modeling software.

The program is available for Windows, an app exists in the play store for Android, app store for iOS, and Windows Phone store.

Use 
To create a 3D model in Catch the user should find a subject that can be easily photographed from many angles in good light. If the user is trying to create a 3D model of something with complex features they can take close up pictures on those areas to give better definition to the resulting model. Autodesk recommends taking between 30 and 40 pictures to create a well rounded model but when photographing larger subjects the user can take up to 70 pictures to give greater detail to the model. Once all of the images are saved they are uploaded to autodesk servers so they can be stitched together and a 3D model can be made. This process can take several minutes. Finally after they model is created it is downloaded to the user's device for viewing and editing. The 3D models created by Catch can be used in a number of ways such as 3D printing.

Sharing 
Catch offers users the ability to view, comment on, rate, and download other users models. Likewise any user of the app has the option to share their creations with the autodesk community via Autodesk's built-in sharing functionality.

Limitations 

Models featuring small parts or hair and fur can cause problems for the Catch software because the mesh created does not allow for such level of detail. When creating a model, the Catch software can have trouble stitching together images that feature reflective or transparent surfaces, even with the user's assistance. Catch can also fail to properly create a model if the subject moves or changes when the photographs are taken. 

Catch processed the user's images on an Autodesk server, therefore internet connection was required. Autodesk servers may be unresponsive at times.

See also

 Comparison of EDA software
 Blender - a comprehensive free and open-source 3D package
 MeshLab - a free and open-source tool similar to MeshMixer, extensively used by the scientific community
 Autodesk Meshmixer, software for manipulating and cleaning up 3D meshes.

References

Ryan Schmidt,  Matt Ratto.  Design to Fabricate,  Maker Hardware Requires Maker Software.IEEE Computer Graphics and Applications.

2009 software
Autodesk discontinued products
3D graphics software
Articles containing video clips
Computer-aided design software